Giuseppe Mussi (2 January 1836 – 18 August 1904) was an Italian politician. He was twice mayor of Corbetta, Lombardy and mayor of Milan. He was a recipient of the Order of Saints Maurice and Lazarus.

References

External links
 

1836 births
1904 deaths
19th-century Italian politicians
20th-century Italian politicians
Recipients of the Order of Saints Maurice and Lazarus
Mayors of Milan